Zasechny is a rural locality (a village) in Chaykovsky, Perm Krai, Russia. The population was 251 as of 2010. There are 15 streets.

Geography 
Zasechny is located 40 km northeast of Chaykovsky. Mokhovaya is the nearest rural locality.

References 

Rural localities in Chaykovsky urban okrug